The Cerro Platillón Natural Monument Also Pico Platillón It is a protected area with the status of natural monument that consists of a mountain formation located in the extreme north of the Guárico state, Venezuela.
At an official height of 1,930 msnm2 Pico Platillón is the highest mountain in Guárico. It is protected as per decree published in Official Gazette of Venezuela, No. 33,664 of February 20, 1987.

Pico Platillón is located in the heart of a mountainous row of the Juan Germán Roscio Natural Monument, west of San Juan de los Morros and south of Lake Valencia. Towards the south we continue with the Topo Cruz and the row La Glorieta. Further to the east in the direction of the city of San Juan are other mountain ranges including the Paraparo Topo.

See also
List of national parks of Venezuela
Cueva Alfredo Jahn Natural Monument

References

Natural monuments of Venezuela
Protected areas established in 1987